Tharbogang is a village and rural locality in the Riverina region of southwest New South Wales, Australia.

Warburn Estate is a winemaker in Tharbogang and is the maker of Gossips, a Cabernet Merlot among other wines

Tharbogang is a former station on the Temora–Roto railway line.

References

External links

Towns in New South Wales
Towns in the Riverina